HNoMS Bergen (pennant number F301) was an  of the Royal Norwegian Navy.

She was launched on 23 August 1965, and commissioned on 22 June 1967. She was decommissioned on 3 August 2005 and broken up in March 2013 at Svolvaer.

Citations

1965 ships
Ships built in Horten
Oslo-class frigates
Cold War frigates of Norway